Ali Adem (born 1 June 2000) is a Macedonian professional footballer who plays as a midfielder for Shkupi.

References

2000 births
Living people
Macedonian footballers
Super League Greece players
Aris Thessaloniki F.C. players
Association football midfielders